Avlon or Avlonas is a former municipality in Euboea, Greece. Since the 2011 local government reform it is part of the municipality Kymi-Aliveri, of which it is a municipal unit. The municipal unit has an area of 143.406 km2. In 2011 its population was 4,498. The seat of the municipality was in Avlonari.

Subdivisions
The municipal unit Avlon is subdivided into the following communities (constituent villages in brackets):
Achladeri (Achladeri, Kalamos, Korasida, Perivolia, Sykies)
Agios Georgios
Avlonari (Avlonari, Chania, Dafni, Elaia, Lofiskos)
Neochori
Oktonia (Oktonia, Agios Merkourios, Mourteri)
Orio (Orio, Myrtea)
Orologi (Orologi, Agia Thekla, Prinaki)
Pyrgi

References

Populated places in Euboea